The European Commission of the Nobility is an organisation for cooperation of associations of European nobility, established in 1959. Its seat is in Paris, France.

Functioning 
The CILANE has no president but rather a "Coordinator", elected for three years. The coordinator's role is to prepare and conduct the spring and autumn sessions of the CILANE and to carry out its decisions, enabling each national association to carry out projects together. It holds an international congress every three years.

The spring session takes place traditionally in Paris, the seat of the CILANE. In autumn the sessions are held in one of the other member countries. Significantly, most of the organisations represented in CILANE are private initiatives, particularly in nations where titles of nobility are no longer recognised by their respective states and therefore unregulated by law.

Due to the position of the Permanent Deputation and Council of the Greatness and Titles of the Kingdom of only recognizing foreign titles as such if «...the succession in these titles should only be reflected when they have been possessed by people who have recognized the succession of kings effectively reigning, but not claimants or holders in exile of disappeared kingdoms", particularly in "...in the case of titles of the extinct Kingdom of the Two Sicilies, such a kingdom no longer exists and the claimants to it are not effectively reigning monarchs" , and the consequent internal divisions within it, Spain does not have official representation in the coordinating organization of the European nobility CILANE.

List of member associations with external links
The delegates represent their nobility associations at the CILANE for the following countries:
 Belgium: Association de la Noblesse du Royaume de Belgique (ANRB-VAKB) 
 Croatia: Croatian Nobility Association 
 Denmark: Danish Nobility Association 
 Germany: Vereinigung der Deutschen Adelsverbände (VdDA) 
 Finland: Finnish House of Nobility (Riddarhuset) 
 France: Association d'entraide de la Noblesse Française (ANF) :fr:Association d'entraide de la noblesse francaise 
 Holy See: Réunion de la Noblesse Pontificale (RNP)
 Hungary: Magyar Történelmi Családok Egyesülete (MTCSE) 
 United Kingdom: Association for Armigerous Families of Great Britain (AFGB)
 Italy: Corpo della Nobiltà Italiana (CNI)  
 Malta: Committee of Privileges of the Maltese Nobility (joined CILANE April 2008) 
 Netherlands: Nederlands Adelvereniging (NAV) 
 Portugal: Associação da Nobreza Histórica Portugal (ANHP)
 Russia: Союз Дворян - Union de la Noblesse Russe (UNR) 
 Sweden: Swedish House of Nobility (Riddarhuset) 
 Switzerland: Association de Familles Suisses (AFS)

See also 
 International Commission on Orders of Chivalry

References

External links
 Official Website
 Article from L'Expansion
 Article from Hola

European nobility
Organizations based in Paris
Organizations established in 1959